Gerolamo Melchiori or Gerolamo Melchiorri (died 1583) was a Roman Catholic prelate who served as Bishop of Recanati (1573–1583) and Bishop of Macerata (1553–1573).

Biography
On 6 Mar 1553, Gerolamo Melchiori was appointed during the papacy of Pope Julius III as Bishop of Macerata.
On 16 Dec 1554, he was consecrated bishop by Giovanni Michele Saraceni, Archbishop of Acerenza e Matera, with Ascanio Ferreri, Bishop Emeritus of Montepeloso, and Giovanni Andrea Croce, Bishop of Tivoli, serving as co-consecrators. 
On 15 Oct 1571, he was appointed during the papacy of Pope Pius V as Bishop of Recanati.
In 1571, he resigned as Bishop of Macerata.
He served as Bishop of Recanati until his death in 1583. 
While bishop, he was the principal co-consecrator of Benedetto Lomellini, Bishop of Luni e Sarzana (1565); and Giulio Sauli, Bishop of Brugnato (1566) .

References

External links and additional sources
 (for Chronology of Bishops) 
 (for Chronology of Bishops) 
 (for Chronology of Bishops) 
 (for Chronology of Bishops) 

16th-century Italian Roman Catholic bishops
Bishops appointed by Pope Julius III
Bishops appointed by Pope Pius V
1583 deaths